Shizue Tatsuta (3 November 1903 - 21 January 1962) was the stage name of Shizue Shiono, a Japanese actress who starred in silent movies. Born in Yamagata Prefecture, she briefly attended Japan Women's University but did not graduate. Moving to Kyoto and joining the Shochiku Studio in 1924, she subsequently starred in over seventy silent films, primarily in the role of modern girl. Her last film, Educating Father  was released in 1935. After retiring from acting, she opened a bar in Tokyo, the city in which she ultimately died aged 58.

Biography
Shizue Shiono was born in the Yamagata Prefecture of Japan on 3 November 1903, although she later claimed to have been born in 1906. After attending the local high school, she moved to Tokyo to study at Japan Women's University, but left before graduating with the ambition to become a photographer. In May 1924, she moved to Kyoto and auditioned for the Shochiku Studio, appearing in her first silent film, titled Kudō no hibiki   or Throat Sound, the same year. She adopted the stage name of Shizue Tatsuta, under which she subsequently appeared in over seventy films, her last, titled Oyaji kyōiku  or Educating Father, being released in 1935. During her time, she worked with directors like Yasujirō Shimazu and Yasujirō Ozu. She then retired and moved to Ginza in Tokyo, opening a bar. She married Aikichi Ikeda, a dealer in luxury furniture, in 1938, with whom she had a child. She died on 21 January 1962 at her home in Setagaya, Tokyo.

As an actress, Shizue frequently played the role of the modern girl. In the nationalistic atmosphere of the time, this character often had the role of antagonist, being subject to inherent flaws that led to her downfall in comparison to the more traditional Japanese values embodied by the protagonist.

Filmography
Shizue's film career lasted between 1924 and 1935 and included appearances in the following films:
 1924 Throat Sound 
 1924 Pirate Island 
 1924 Deciduous Song 
 1925 Kouei is Hell 
 1926 Dawn of Tears 
 1927 Tears 
 1927 New Pearl 
 1927 The Hero of the Sea 
 1927 The Man Who Picked up Love 
 1928 Weak People 
 1928 Spring Hiraku 
 1929 A New Kind of Woman 
 1930 An Introduction to Marriage 
 1930 I Love Women 
 1930 Sisters 
 1930 New edition, I am Sin Sakubei 
 1930 Young Lady 
 1933 The Bride Talks 
 1935 Educating Father

References

Citations

Bibliography
 
 
 
 

1903 births
1962 deaths
Actors from Yamagata Prefecture
Japanese silent film actresses